The Love Pirate is a 1923 American silent drama film directed by Richard Thomas and starring Melbourne MacDowell, Carmel Myers and Kathryn McGuire.

Cast
 Melbourne MacDowell as Steve Carnan
 Carmel Myers as Ruby Le Maar
 Charles Force as 	Tim Gordan
 Kathryn McGuire as 	Ruth Revere
 Clyde Fillmore as Chief Deputy Hugh Waring
 John Tonkey as Cregg Winslow
 Carol Holloway as Mrs. Carnan
 Edward W. Borman as Joe Harris
 Spottiswoode Aitken as Cyrus Revere

References

Bibliography
 Connelly, Robert B. The Silents: Silent Feature Films, 1910-36, Volume 40, Issue 2. December Press, 1998.
 Munden, Kenneth White. The American Film Institute Catalog of Motion Pictures Produced in the United States, Part 1. University of California Press, 1997.

External links
 

1923 films
1923 drama films
1920s English-language films
American silent feature films
Silent American drama films
American black-and-white films
Film Booking Offices of America films
1920s American films